The 1924–25 Serie A season was the first season of the Serie A, the top level of ice hockey in Italy. Two teams participated in the league, and Hockey Club Milano won the championship by defeating GSD Cortina in the final.

Final

 Hockey Club Milano - GSD Cortina 9:0  (Goals: Decio Trovati 3, Guido Botturi 3, Luigi Redaelli 2, Miletto Sancassani)

External links
 Season on hockeytime.net

1924–25 in Italian ice hockey
Serie A (ice hockey) seasons
Italy